Angst in My Pants is the eleventh studio album by American pop and rock band Sparks. The album was released in 1982 by Atlantic Records in both the US and UK, and this was the 6th overall label that the band was signed to in the US, and, for the first time since the mid-1970s, the band would be signed the same label in both the US and UK for 3 consecutive albums.

History
Angst in My Pants marked the second studio album that keyboardist Ron Mael and lead vocalist Russell Mael worked with the backing band of guitarist Bob Haag, bassist Leslie Bohem, and drummer David Kendrick. James Goodwin augmented the line-up playing additional synthesizers, though these were mixed farther back, letting the rest of the band come to the fore. The resulting power pop album was recorded at Musicland Studios in Munich, Germany produced by Mack in association with Giorgio Moroder Enterprises. The recording of the album was the second and last time that Sparks worked with Mack.

In a 1990 interview with Trouser Press, the band discussed how the title track came about from being short one song after the rest of the album had been recorded. According to Russell Mael:We had another song called "Angst in My Pants" with a totally different melody. It was going to be on the album, but we didn't like it that much. We needed one more song for the album. We're usually well prepared before we record, but somehow we were one song short. We'd finished recording all the other songs. One day in the hotel in Munich, Ron came up with that melody and stuck the old title onto the new song. Mack really liked the song and we recorded it.

Release
Angst in My Pants was not a success in the UK but was as successful as their previous studio album, Whomp That Sucker (1981), in the U.S. where it peaked at No. 173 on the Billboard 200.

The single "I Predict" became Sparks' first entry on the Billboard Hot 100 peaking at No. 60 in May 1982. This was the first time since the release of "Wonder Girl" in 1971 that Sparks had enjoyed moderate success on the U.S. single charts. An extended remix of "I Predict" was released as a club promo while the 7" single was backed with the album track "Moustache". The music video for "I Predict" was directed by Douglas Brian Martin, with cinematography by Frederick Elmes.

"Angst in My Pants" and "Eaten by the Monster of Love" were both used in the movie Valley Girl, a romantic comedy released in 1983. "Eaten by the Monster of Love" was also featured in the 2009 horror movie Cabin Fever 2. It was also featured in the sixth season episode of Gilmore Girls, "The Real Paul Anka".

The band performed "Mickey Mouse" and "I Predict" as musical guests on the May 15, 1982 episode of Saturday Night Live, hosted by Danny DeVito. "Mickey Mouse" was prefaced by a monologue from Ron Mael, in a deadpan style, describing the characteristics of the common mouse and its various activities (including "scaring women" and "ingesting huge amounts of saccharine for laboratory experiments".) leading up to the introduction of the song title.

Track listing

Personnel
Credits are adapted from the Angst in My Pants liner notes.

 Russell Mael — vocals
 Ron Mael — keyboards, synthesizers, cover concept
 Leslie Bohem — bass guitar, additional background vocals
 Bob Haag — guitar, additional background vocals
 David Kendrick — drums
 James Goodwin — synthesizers
 Mack — production, engineering, synthesizer programming

References

External links
 

Sparks (band) albums
1982 albums
Albums produced by Reinhold Mack
Atlantic Records albums
Carrere Records albums
Oglio Records albums
Repertoire Records albums
Synth-pop albums by American artists